Black Stone: Magic & Steel, known in Japan as , is a role-playing video game developed by XPEC Entertainment and published by Xicat Interactive for the Xbox. The theme song is "be with you" by Chihiro Yonekura.

Gameplay
In a quest to stop Xylon, the player can choose one of the five character classes. Through 26 levels, all enemies including scorpions, goblins, or bugs, can be dealt with by a melee combat, ranged weapons, and magical attacks.

Reception

The game received "generally unfavorable reviews" according to the review aggregation website Metacritic. In Japan, Famitsu gave it a score of 23 out of 40.

References

External links
 

2003 video games
Role-playing video games
Xbox games
Xbox-only games
Video games developed in Taiwan
Xicat Interactive games
THQ games
Multiplayer and single-player video games
Idea Factory games